William Stewart Campbell (December 2, 1933 - February 11, 2009) was an American production designer and art director. He was nominated for three Academy Awards in the category Best Art Direction.

Selected filmography
Campbell was nominated for three Academy Awards for Best Art Direction:
 Chinatown (1974)
 Shampoo (1975)
 The Right Stuff (1983)

References

External links

1933 births
2009 deaths
American production designers
American art directors